Bagʻdod ( or) is an urban-type settlement in Fergana Region, Uzbekistan. It is the administrative center of Bagʻdod District. The town population in 1989 was 10,086.

References

Populated places in Fergana Region
Urban-type settlements in Uzbekistan